Solar Physics is a peer-reviewed scientific journal published monthly by Springer Science+Business Media. The editors-in-chief are Lidia van Driel-Gesztelyi (various affiliations), John Leibacher 
(National Solar Observatory,  and Institut d'Astrophysique Spatiale), Cristina Mandrini 
(Universidad de Buenos Aires), and Inigo Arregui (Instituto de Astrofísica de Canarias).

Scope and history
The focus of this journal is fundamental research on the Sun and it covers all aspects of solar physics. Topical coverage includes solar-terrestrial physics and stellar research if it pertains to the focus of this journal. Publishing formats include regular manuscripts, invited reviews, invited memoirs, and topical collections. Solar Physics was established in 1967 by solar physicists Cornelis de Jager and Zdeněk Švestka, and publisher D. Reidel.

Abstracting and indexing
This journal is indexed by the following services:
 Science Citation Index 
 Scopus 
 INSPEC 
 Chemical Abstracts Service
 Current Contents/Physical, Chemical & Earth Sciences 
 GeoRef
 Journal Citation Reports
 SIMBAD

References

External links
 

Astrophysics journals
Springer Science+Business Media academic journals
Publications established in 1967
English-language journals